DeShawn Wynn (born October 9, 1983) is an American professional football player who was a running back in the National Football League (NFL) for four seasons.  He played college football for the University of Florida, and was a member of their 2006 National Championship team.  He was drafted by the Green Bay Packers in the seventh round of the 2007 NFL Draft, and has also played for the New Orleans Saints and San Francisco 49ers of the NFL.

Early years 

Wynn was born in Cincinnati, Ohio in 1983.  He attended Reading High School in Reading, Ohio, where he played high school football for the Reading Blue Devils.  As a senior in 2001, he was regarded as one of the nation's elite high school backs, with 2,283 yards on 246 carries with thirty touchdowns.  Wynn rushed for 2,000 or more yards three of four years, and also played linebacker and safety.  He was recognized as a Parade magazine high school All-American in 2002.

College career 

Wynn accepted an athletic scholarship to attend the University of Florida in Gainesville, Florida, where he played for coach Ron Zook and coach Urban Meyer's Florida Gators football teams from 2003 to 2006.  He was the Gators' starting running back in their 41–14 victory over the Ohio State Buckeyes in the 2007 BCS National Championship Game.  Wynn finished his four-year college career with 2,077 rushing yards, 376 receiving yards and twenty-five touchdowns.

Professional career

Green Bay Packers 

Wynn scored his first two career touchdowns against the New York Giants in Week 2 of the NFL season.  He also scored a touchdown in back to back weeks versus the Chicago Bears and the Washington Redskins.

On October 29, 2007 against the Denver Broncos on Monday Night Football, Wynn injured his shoulder on his first rushing play of the game. The next day Wynn was put on injured reserve and missed the rest of the season.  He finished the season with 203 rushing yards on 50 attempts and four touchdowns.

On August 25, 2008, Wynn was released by the Packers.  He was re-signed to the Packers practice squad on August 31. He remained there until October 11, when he was signed to the active roster after running back Kregg Lumpkin was placed on injured reserve. He finished the season playing in five games rushing for 110 yards on eight attempts, with 73 of those yards coming on a week 17 touchdown run against the Detroit Lions.

New Orleans Saints 

Wynn signed with the New Orleans Saints on August 23, 2010. He was released on September 22. He was re-signed to the practice squad the next day and signed to the active roster again on October 2. He was waived again on October 12.

San Francisco 49ers 

On November 5, 2010 Wynn was signed by the San Francisco 49ers to their practice squad. He was promoted to the active roster a few weeks later after Frank Gore was placed on Injured Reserve with a broken hip.
On December 27, 2010, Wynn was waived by the 49ers.

New Orleans Saints (second stint) 

Wynn was re-signed by the New Orleans Saints on January 3, 2011.

Saskatchewan Roughriders 

On March 13, 2012, it was announced that Wynn had been signed by the Saskatchewan Roughriders.

See also 

 List of Florida Gators in the NFL Draft
 List of Green Bay Packers players
 List of New Orleans Saints players

References

Bibliography 

 Carlson, Norm, University of Florida Football Vault: The History of the Florida Gators, Whitman Publishing, LLC, Atlanta, Georgia (2007).  .

External links 
  DeShawn Wynn – Florida Gators player profile
  DeShawn Wynn – New Orleans Saints player profile
  DeShawn Wynn – Saskatchewan Roughriders player profile

1983 births
Living people
People from Reading, Ohio
Players of American football from Cincinnati
Players of Canadian football from Cincinnati
African-American players of American football
American football running backs
Florida Gators football players
Green Bay Packers players
New Orleans Saints players
San Francisco 49ers players
African-American players of Canadian football
Canadian football running backs
Saskatchewan Roughriders players
21st-century African-American sportspeople
20th-century African-American people